From Toledo to Tokyo is a DVD released by American alternative/indie group Mae. It is a documentary/live performance of the Japan tour.

The name of the DVD is derived from a lyric taken from "We're So Far Away", the second track on their CD The Everglow.

Sections 

Documentary spanning Mae's first year of tour (100 minutes)
Interviews with the band
Live performances
Fans
Band History
Snow Storms
Appearances by:
Something Corporate
The Starting Line
Copeland
And More
Live performance from Mae's hometown venue (40 minutes)
Futuro
All Deliberate Speed
Runaway
Anything
Skyline Drive
Sun
Soundtrack for Our Movie
Summertime
Documentary capturing Mae's first tour in Japan (25 minutes)
This Time Is the Last Time
Suspension
Embers and Envelopes

Mae video albums
2005 live albums
Live video albums